Thomas of Piedmont may refer to:
Thomas I of Piedmont
Thomas II of Piedmont
Thomas III of Piedmont